In molecular biology, Small nucleolar RNA SNORA48 is a pseudouridylation guide H/ACA box snoRNA. This snoRNA was cloned in 2004 from a HeLa cell extract immunoprecipitated with an anti-GAR1 antibody. It is predicted to guide the pseudouridylation of residue U3797 of 28S rRNA.

The pseudouridylation of this residue had been reported in 1997. The H/ACA box snoRNAs ACA48 and U67, and the C/D box snoRNA mgU6-77, share the same host gene (EIF4A1).

References

External links 
 
 

Small nuclear RNA